The Junior men's race at the 2005 IAAF World Cross Country Championships was held at the Hippodrome Joseph Desjoyaux in Saint-Galmier near Saint-Étienne, France, on March 20, 2005.  Reports of the event were given in The New York Times, in the Herald, and for the IAAF.

Complete results for individuals, for teams, medallists, and the results of British athletes who took part were published.

Race results

Junior men's race (8 km)

Individual

Teams

Note: Athletes in parentheses did not score for the team result.

Participation
According to an unofficial count, 131 athletes from 37 countries participated in the Junior men's race.  This is in agreement with the official numbers as published.  The announced athlete from  did not show.

 (6)
 (6)
 (1)
 (3)
 (4)
 (2)
 (6)
 (1)
 (1)
 (4)
 (6)
 (6)
 (2)
 (1)
 (6)
 (6)
 (1)
 (6)
 (1)
 (6)
 (1)
 (4)
 (1)
 (2)
 (6)
 (6)
 (1)
 (1)
 (6)
 (6)
 (1)
 (5)
 (6)
 (6)
 (2)
 (1)
 (1)

See also
 2005 IAAF World Cross Country Championships – Senior men's race
 2005 IAAF World Cross Country Championships – Men's short race
 2005 IAAF World Cross Country Championships – Senior women's race
 2005 IAAF World Cross Country Championships – Women's short race
 2005 IAAF World Cross Country Championships – Junior women's race

References

Junior men's race at the World Athletics Cross Country Championships
IAAF World Cross Country Championships
2005 in youth sport